George Bagration of Mukhrani, Giorgi Bagration-Mukhraneli or Prince Georgi Alexandrovich Bagration-Mukhranski ( – 29 September 1957) was a Georgian nobleman, and a titular head of the House of Mukhrani, a collateral branch of the former royal dynasty of Bagrationi.

Biography
George was born in Saint Petersburg, Russia, the son of Prince Alexander Bagration of Mukhrani and Princess Maria née Golovatcheva. He was educated at the Page Corps. He married, in July 1908, Helena Sigismundovna, née Złotnicka-Nowina (Tiflis,  – Madrid, 25 April 1979), daughter of Czeslaw-Zygmunt Dimitrievich Złotnicki (Borszczewka, Poland, Russia, 2 June 1849 - ?) and wife Princess Mariam Elisabarovna Eristova of Ksani (Georgia, Russia, 1858 - 1934), a remote descendant of the 18th-century Georgian king Erekle II, paternal granddaughter of Dimitri Antonovich Złotnicki (1805 - 14 December 1865, son of Antoni Polikarp Złotnicki and wife Elisaveta Dmitrievna Norova) and wife Celestina Celestinovna Trzeciak (daughter of Celestin Melchiorovich Trzeciak and wife Elisaveta Beinarovicza), maternal granddaughter of Prince Elisabar Giorgievich Eristov of Ksani (1810 - 1872, son of Prince Shanse Eristov-Ksansky and wife Princess Elena Ivanovna Orbeliani) and wife Princess Kethevan Shalvaevna Eristova (1826 - ?, daughter of Prince Shalva Revazovich Eristov-Ksansky and wife Princess Ekaterina Aslanovna Orbeliani).

George Bagration served as a marshal of the Council of Nobility of Dusheti in Georgia from 1916 to 1917. After the Russian Revolution of 1917, he hailed independent Georgia and fought against the Bolsheviks during the Russian Civil War. George chose to stay in Georgia rather than follow his wife and children in exile following the Sovietization of the country in 1921. He was, nevertheless, arrested by the Soviet authorities in 1930, but was soon released through the efforts of the Russian writer Maxim Gorky. George Bagration left the Soviet Union and joined his family in their European exile. He finally settled in Spain in 1944. His son, Irakli, was energetically involved in Georgian political émigré activities. One of his daughters, the second one, Leonida, married Vladimir Cyrillovich Romanov, Pretender to the Russian throne; the other, Maria, homesick, returned to Soviet Georgia, but was arrested in 1948 and had to spend eight years in exile in Magadan. She died in Tbilisi in 1992.

George Bagration of Mukhrani died in Madrid, Spain, in 1957. His remains were brought back to Georgia by his grandson Jorge de Bagration in 1995 and interred at the Cathedral of Living Pillar at Mtskheta.

Ancestors

References 

1884 births
1957 deaths
George Bagration of Mukhrani
Nobility of Georgia (country)
Nobility from Saint Petersburg
Emigrants from the Russian Empire to Spain